HomeBank is a personal accounting software package that runs on OpenBSD, Linux, FreeBSD, Microsoft Windows, macOS (via MacPorts or Homebrew) and AmigaOS. 
Released under the GPL-2.0-or-later license, HomeBank is free software. HomeBank can be found in the software repositories of Linux distributions such as Debian, Fedora, Mandriva, openSUSE, Gentoo Linux, Arch Linux and Ubuntu.

History 
Development of HomeBank began in 1995 on Amiga. Stable version 1.0 was released in January 1998 as a shareware. In May 2003, version 3.0 was released as free software and a full rewrite was started using the C language and the Gtk+ library. Version 3.2 was released in September 2006 on GNU/Linux. As of August 2007, HomeBank is available on Mac OS. In May 2008, version 3.8 was also released on Microsoft Windows.

See also

 List of personal finance software

References

External links

Free accounting software
Free software programmed in C
Office software that uses GTK
Accounting software for Linux
Amiga software